Suire is a French surname. Notable people with this surname include:

 Catherine Suire (born 1959), French tennis player
 Jacques Suire (born 1943), French cyclist
 Karl von Le Suire (1898–1954), German general
 Pierre-André Le Suire (1742–?), French enameller
 Wilhelm von Le Suire (1787–1852), Bavarian lieutenant general

See also
 Suir